Joseph Thomas Last (1849, Tuddenham- 1933, Shortlands)  was an English missionary, explorer and naturalist.

In 1872 Last was ordained at the Church Missionary College. From 1874 to 1876 he was in East Africa at the mission at Kisulutini. He briefly returned to Britain and then in 1877 he was appointed to the Usagara Mission at Mpwapwa. In 1880 he founded a new station at Mamboya in the Nguru mountains. After seven years in East Africa he returned to Britain in December 1884. Later he was associated with Royal Geographical Society and the Imperial British East Africa Company. He visited Portuguese East Africa in 1885, explored the Namuli Mountains and discovered the caves at Mangapwani in Zanzibar.

Last made important collections of African Lepidoptera and Mollusca.

Works
partial list
Notes on Western Madagascar and the Antinosi Country
A Visit to the Masai People Living beyond the Borders of Nguru Country.Proceedings of the Royal Geographical Society 5 (9): 517-543, 568 (map), 1883.
Grammar of the Kamba Language, Eastern Equatorial Africa (1885)
On the Society's Expedition to the Namuli Hills, East Africa Proceedings of the Royal Geographical Society 1887.

References
Bernard Verdcourt, 1980 J.T. Last - 1849-1933 - Collectors in East Africa - 2 The Conchologists' Newsletter, No. 74, pp. 248–249.

English entomologists
Conchologists
1849 births
1933 deaths